A jaguar is a large cat native to South and Central America.

Jaguar may also refer to:

Transportation
 Jaguar Cars
 UAZ Jaguar
 Armstrong Siddeley Jaguar, an aircraft engine
 SS Empire Ballad, a Panamanian steamship built in 1941 and renamed SS Jaguar in 1962

Entertainment

Cartoons, comics and print
 Jaguar (Insurgent Comix), a superheroine
 Jaguar (Archie Comics), a comics character
 Jaguar (cartoonist), Sérgio Jaguaribe (born 1932) from Brazil
 Jaguar (novel), by Roland Smith

Music
 Jaguar (band), a new wave British heavy metal band
 Jagúar (band), an Icelandic funk band
 Jaguar (musician),  a Kenyan musician and politician 
 The Jaguars, an American doo wop group known for their 1956 cover of "The Way You Look Tonight"
 The Jaguars, a 1960s Japanese band featured on the Banzai! TV series
 Fender Jaguar, a guitar introduced in 1962
 "Knights of the Jaguar", often shortened as "Jaguar", a techno song by DJ Rolando
 Jaguar, the 2020 EP released by pop singer Victoria Monét
Jaguar Bingham, a British DJ

Film
 Jaguar (1967 film), French
 Jaguar (1979 film), Filipino
 Jaguar (1994 film), Greek
 Jaguar (2016 film), Indian

Other
 Jaguar!, a roller coaster at Knott's Berry Farm

Science and technology
 Atari Jaguar, a game console
 Jaguar (supercomputer), built by Cray, became operational in 2005
 Jaguar (microarchitecture), a CPU design
 Jaguar (British rocket), a research rocket
 Jaguar (American rocket), a sounding rocket
 Jaguar (software), for computational chemistry
 Jaguar, the marketing name for the Mac OS X 10.2 operating system
 Jaguar (Hewlett-Packard), a code name for the HP 95LX palmtop PC
 Claas Jaguar, a forage harvester

Sports
 Argentina Jaguars, an Argentine secondary national rugby team
 Chiapas F.C., a Mexican association football team, also known as Chiapas Jaguar
 IUPUI Jaguars, the sports teams of Indiana University – Purdue University Indianapolis
 Jacksonville Jaguars, a professional American football team
 Jaguar Racing, automobile racing teams
 Jaguar Yokota (b. 1961), Japanese wrestler
 South Alabama Jaguars, the sports teams of the University of South Alabama
 South American Jaguars, an international rugby team active in the 1980s
 Southern Jaguars and Lady Jaguars, the sports teams of Southern University and A&M College
 UHV Jaguars, the sports teams of the University of Houston–Victoria
 USJ-R Jaguars, the sports teams of the University of San Jose–Recoletos

Military and weapons
 , a Royal Navy destroyer sunk in the Second World War
 , a Royal Navy destroyer launched in 1957 and sold to the Bangladeshi Navy in 1978
 French destroyer Jaguar (1922–1940), a Chacal-class destroyer
 Jaguar class fast attack craft, a German S-boat
 , a US Navy World War II tanker
 Jaguar 1, a German tank destroyer
 Jaguar 2, a German tank destroyer
 SEPECAT Jaguar, a military aircraft
 Grumman XF10F Jaguar, a cancelled prototype military aircraft first flown in 1952
 Beretta 70 "Jaguar", a hand gun model
 EBRC Jaguar, a French armoured reconnaissance vehicle

Other uses
 Jaguar (beverage), an alcoholic/energy drink

See also
 Jaguar warriors, elite members of the Aztec military

 Jaguarundi
 Jaguares (disambiguation)
 JAGS (disambiguation)
 JAG (disambiguation)